Julius Anton Adam, known as "Cats Adam", (18 May 1852 – 23 February 1913) was a German genre painter and animalier specialising in pictures of cats.

Life 

Julius Adam was a member of the important Adam family of Munich artists. His grandfather was Albrecht Adam, his uncles were Benno, Franz and Eugen Adam, and his cousin Emil Adam, all painters. His father, also called Julius Adam (1821–1874), was primarily a lithographer and photographer. At first Adam (the son) was occupied with landscape photography and worked for his father's business in Rio de Janeiro but later returned to Munich and settled down as a genre painter.

Initially Adam was a pupil of Prof. Michael Echter (1812–1879), later of Wilhelm von Diez (1839–1907) at the Akademie der Bildenden Künste in Munich. He began producing his successful cat pictures in 1882, the international popularity of which caused the high quality of his other work to be somewhat overlooked.

He married his first cousin Amalie, daughter of his uncle Benno, but they had no children.

Grave 

According to the inscription on the monument of Julius Adam's grandfather, Albrecht Adam (1786 – 1862), in the Alter Südfriedhof in Munich (Gräberfeld 27 - Reihe 1 - Platz 25/26), Julius's grave is next to it, but the cemetery registers have no record of the burial.

Notes and references

Sources

External links 

 TheGreatCat.org: Julius Adam II
 Cat paintings of Julius Adam
 Gemälde von Julius Adam in an episode of Lieb & Teuer, 5 February 2017, video 

1852 births
1913 deaths
Artists from Munich
Cat artists
German genre painters
19th-century German painters
19th-century German male artists
20th-century German painters
20th-century German male artists
German painters of animals